Yozyovon is district of Fergana Region, Uzbekistan. Its seat is at the town Yozyovon. The district consists of 9 urban-type settlements (Yozyovon, Yozyovon chek, Yoʻldoshobod, Qorasoqol, Qoratepa, Kelajak, Quyi Soyboʻyi, Toshxovuz, Xonobod) and 10 rural communities (Guliston, Qatortol, Karatepa, Xonobod, Istiqlol, Yozyovon, Yangiobod, Ishtirxon, Qorasoqol, Yangiboʻston).

References

Districts of Uzbekistan
Fergana Region